All 35 independent nations of the Americas are member states of the Organization of American States (OAS).

Member States 

When formed on 5 May 1948 there were 21 members of the OAS. The organization's membership expanded as other nations in the Americas gained full political independence as sovereign states.

Non-members

The following jurisdictions are not members of the OAS as each is a dependent territory of another nation. They are grouped under the nation that has sovereignty over them.

Observers 
The observer states are:

 Albania
 Algeria
 Angola
 Armenia
 Austria
 Azerbaijan
 Bangladesh
 Belgium
 Benin
 Bosnia and Herzegovina
 Bulgaria
 China
 Croatia
 Cyprus
 Czech Republic
 Denmark
 Egypt
 Equatorial Guinea
 Estonia
 European Union
 Finland
 France
 Georgia
 Germany
 Ghana
 Greece
 Hungary
 Iceland
 India
 Ireland
 Israel
 Italy
 Japan
 Kazakhstan
 South Korea
 Latvia
 Lebanon
 Liechtenstein
 Lithuania
 Luxembourg
 North Macedonia
 Malta
 Moldova
 Monaco
 Montenegro
 Morocco
 Netherlands
 Nigeria
 Norway
 Pakistan
 Philippines
 Poland
 Portugal
 Qatar
 Romania
 Russia (suspended)
 Saudi Arabia
 Serbia
 Slovakia
 Slovenia
 Spain
 Sri Lanka
 Sweden
 Switzerland
 Thailand
 Tunisia
 Turkey
 Ukraine
 United Kingdom
 Uzbekistan
 Vanuatu
 Vatican City
 Yemen

Footnotes

References

Organization of American States
Organization of American States